Der Hauptmann von Köpenick (English: The Captain of Köpenick) is a 1997 Germany historical drama film directed by Frank Beyer, written by Wolfgang Kohlhaase, and starring Harald Juhnke. It was based on a 1931 play of the same name, which tells the true story of Wilhelm Voigt.

Cast
 Harald Juhnke: Wilhelm Voigt
 Udo Samel: Bürgermeister Obermüller
 Elisabeth Trissenaar: Mathilde Obermüller
 Katharina Thalbach: Marie Hoprecht
 Rolf Hoppe: Zuchthausdirektor
 Hark Bohm: Kriminalinspektor Schmude
 Jürgen Hentsch: Kriminaldirektor Mehlhorn
 Sophie Rois: Mieze
 Gerry Wolff: Krakauer
 Florian Lukas: Willy Wormser
 Alexander Beyer: Melder

External links
 

1997 films
1997 television films
German films based on plays
Films based on works by Carl Zuckmayer
Films directed by Frank Beyer
Films set in Berlin
1990s German-language films
German television films
German-language television shows
Television shows based on plays
Films about con artists
Films set in 1906
German biographical films
Biographical films about fraudsters
Cultural depictions of Wilhelm Voigt
1990s German films
Das Erste original programming